Guilherme Pina (born 21 July 1998) is a Portuguese swimmer. He competed in the men's 1500 metre freestyle event at the 2017 World Aquatics Championships.

References

1998 births
Living people
Portuguese male freestyle swimmers
Place of birth missing (living people)
Swimmers at the 2018 Mediterranean Games
European Games competitors for Portugal
Swimmers at the 2015 European Games
Mediterranean Games competitors for Portugal